The 2003–04 New Zealand Figure Skating Championships was held at the Paradice in Botany Downs, Auckland from 6 through 9 October 2003. Skaters competed in the disciplines of men's singles and ladies' singles across many levels, including senior, junior, novice, adult, and the pre-novice disciplines of juvenile, pre-primary, primary, and intermediate.

Senior results

Men

Ladies

External links
 2003–04 New Zealand Figure Skating Championships results

2003 in figure skating
New Zealand Figure Skating Championships
Figure Skating
October 2003 sports events in New Zealand